The m/37  helmet is a military steel combat helmet used by Swedish armed forces. Replacing the m/21 helmet, the m/37 would be modernized in 1965  with an updated liner and see use into the 1990s with its replacement by the M1990 Kevlar helmet. Three main variants existed. The first had a three pad liner system, like the m/21 and m/26 before it. The third, most common versions of the modified helmets had the same liner as the pictures but with a canvas chinstrap with a quick-release system. The helmet could be gray, as it always was during the second world war, or painted green as it often, but not always, was during the cold war.

Design

The helmet features a shell design distinct from its predecessors, being more hemispherical in its appearance with a simplified shape. The M1937 shared the same liner as its former designs, featuring a three pad liner attached directly to the shell like the M1926, along with a simple buckle chinstrap. Sweden would provide Finland with this model helmet as aid during their conflict with the Soviet Union (known as the Winter War).  Finland produced a copy of the M37 known as the M40 at the Wartsila Oy and Kone-ja Silta plants. The main difference between the Finnish production helmets being the M40 was made of slightly heavier materials for the shell and painted in a green color as opposed to the Swedish grey. In 1965, most helmets received a new liner, being attached to the top of the shell by only a single rivet made up of a canvas webbing and sheet metal attached to a leather sweatband. The model with the modernized liner being commonly known as the M37/65. The Finnish M40s also receiving a modernized liner nearly identical to the M37/65 around the same time. Commonly used with the helmet was a plain color camouflage net cover in dark green named the M1960. The cover has a simple drawstring design where the chin straps would loop through the cover to keep it in place, and a drawstring on top of the cover to size it to the shell. An additional component of the cover being fold down flaps to cover additional areas of the head as well as a sun brim.

References

External links

Combat helmets of Sweden
Military equipment introduced in the 1930s